The 2016 College Football All-America Team includes those players of American college football who have been honored by various selector organizations as the best players at their respective positions.  The selector organizations award the "All-America" honor annually following the conclusion of the fall college football season.  The original All-America team was the 1889 College Football All-America Team selected by Caspar Whitney and Walter Camp.  In 1950, the National Collegiate Athletic Bureau, which is the National Collegiate Athletic Association's (NCAA) service bureau, compiled the first list of All-Americans including first-team selections on teams created for a national audience that received national circulation with the intent of recognizing selections made from viewpoints that were nationwide.  Since 1957, College Sports Information Directors of America (CoSIDA) has bestowed Academic All-American recognition on male and female athletes in Divisions I, II, and III of the NCAA as well as National Association of Intercollegiate Athletics athletes, covering all NCAA championship sports.

The 2016 College Football All-America Team is composed of the following College Football All-American first teams chosen by the following selector organizations: Associated Press (AP), Football Writers Association of America (FWAA), American Football Coaches Association (AFCA), Walter Camp Foundation (WCFF), The Sporting News (TSN), Sports Illustrated (SI), USA Today (USAT) ESPN, CBS Sports (CBS), College Football News (CFN), Scout.com, Athlon Sports, and Fox Sports (FOX).

Currently, the NCAA compiles consensus all-America teams in the sports of Division I-FBS football and Division I men's basketball using a point system computed from All-America teams named by coaches associations or media sources.  Players are chosen against other players playing at their position only.  To be selected a consensus All-American, players must be chosen to the first team on at least two of the five official selectors as recognized by the NCAA.  Second- and third-team honors are used to break ties.  Players named first-team to all five selectors are deemed unanimous All-Americans. Currently, the NCAA recognizes All-Americans selected by the AP, AFCA, FWAA, TSN, and the WCFF to determine consensus and unanimous All-Americans.

Twenty-seven players were recognized as consensus All-Americans for 2016, 14 of them being unanimous. Unanimous selections are followed by an asterisk (*).

Offense

Quarterback
Lamar Jackson, Louisville (AFCA, FWAA, AP, WCFF, TSN, SI, USAT, ESPN, FOX, CBS, Athlon)

Running back
Dalvin Cook, Florida State (AFCA, FWAA, AP, WCFF, TSN, USAT, ESPN, FOX, CBS, Athlon)
D'Onta Foreman, Texas (AFCA, FWAA, AP, TSN, SI, USAT, ESPN, FOX, CBS, Athlon)
Donnel Pumphrey, San Diego State (WCFF, SI)

Wide receiver
Corey Davis, Western Michigan (AFCA, FWAA, AP, SI, USAT, FOX, CBS, Athlon)
Zay Jones, East Carolina (WCFF, TSN, ESPN)
John Ross, Washington (ESPN)
Dede Westbrook, Oklahoma (AFCA, FWAA, AP, WCFF, TSN, SI, USAT, ESPN, FOX, CBS, Athlon)

Tight end
Jake Butt, Michigan (AFCA, WCFF)
Evan Engram, Ole Miss (AP, TSN, SI, USAT, CBS, Athlon)
O. J. Howard, Alabama (FOX)
Michael Roberts, Toledo (FWAA)

Offensive line
Pat Elflein, Ohio State (AFCA, FWAA, AP, WCFF, TSN, SI, USAT, ESPN, FOX, CBS, Athlon)
Dan Feeney, Indiana (AP, FOX)
Dorian Johnson, Pittsburgh (AFCA, TSN, SI, ESPN)
Roderick Johnson, Florida State (WCFF)
Cody O'Connell, Washington State (AFCA, FWAA, AP, WCFF, TSN, SI, USAT, ESPN, FOX, CBS, Athlon)
Ethan Pocic, LSU (FWAA)
Billy Price, Ohio State (AFCA)
Ryan Ramczyk, Wisconsin (AP, TSN, SI, USAT, ESPN, FOX, CBS, Athlon)
Cam Robinson, Alabama (AFCA, FWAA, AP, WCFF, TSN, SI, ESPN, FOX, CBS, Athlon)
Nico Siragusa, San Diego State (USAT)
Connor Williams, Texas (FWAA, WCFF, USAT, CBS, Athlon)

Defense

Defensive line
Jonathan Allen, Alabama (AFCA, FWAA, AP, WCFF, TSN, SI, USAT, ESPN, FOX, CBS)
Derek Barnett, Tennessee (AP, WCFF, SI, USAT, ESPN, FOX, CBS)
Myles Garrett, Texas A&M (AFCA, FWAA, AP, WCFF, TSN, FOX)
Carl Lawson, Auburn (FWAA)
Ed Oliver, Houston (AP, TSN, SI, USAT, ESPN, FOX, CBS)
DeMarcus Walker, Florida State (AFCA, WCFF, TSN, USAT)
Carlos Watkins, Clemson, (CBS)
Christian Wilkins, Clemson (AFCA, FWAA)

Linebacker
Zach Cunningham, Vanderbilt (AFCA, FWAA, AP, WCFF, TSN, SI, USAT, ESPN, FOX, CBS)
Reuben Foster, Alabama (AFCA, FWAA, AP, WCFF, TSN, SI, USAT, ESPN, FOX, CBS)
Jabrill Peppers, Michigan (AFCA, FWAA, AP, WCFF, TSN, SI, USAT, ESPN, FOX, CBS)
T. J. Watt, Wisconsin (SI, ESPN)

Defensive back
Jamal Adams, LSU (USAT, CBS)
Budda Baker, Washington (FWAA, TSN, SI, ESPN, FOX)
Minkah Fitzpatrick, Alabama (AFCA, AP, ESPN)
Malik Hooker, Ohio State (AFCA, FWAA, AP, WCFF, TSN, SI, USAT, ESPN, FOX, CBS)
Marlon Humphrey, Alabama (FWAA)
Adoree' Jackson, Southern California (AP, WCFF, TSN, FOX, CBS)
Desmond King, Iowa (SI, USAT, FOX)
Jourdan Lewis, Michigan (AFCA, AP, WCFF, TSN, SI, ESPN, CBS)
Tarvarus McFadden, Florida State (FWAA)
Cordrea Tankersley, Clemson (USAT)
Tre'Davious White, LSU (AFCA, WCFF)

Special teams

Kicker
Zane Gonzalez, Arizona State (AFCA, FWAA, AP, WCFF, TSN, SI, USAT, ESPN, FOX, CBS)

Punter
Johnny Townsend, Florida (CBS)
Mitch Wishnowsky, Utah (AFCA, FWAA, AP, WCFF, TSN, SI, USAT, ESPN, FOX)

All-purpose / return specialist
Quadree Henderson, Pittsburgh (FWAA, WCFF, TSN, SI, USAT, FOX, CBS)
Adoree' Jackson, Southern California (AFCA, FWAA, TSN, SI, ESPN, CBS)
Christian McCaffrey, Stanford (FOX)
Jabrill Peppers, Michigan (CBS)
Curtis Samuel, Ohio State (AP, TSN)

See also
 2016 All-ACC football team
 2016 All-SEC football team
 2016 All-Big Ten Conference football team
 2016 All-Big 12 Conference football team
 2016 All-Pac-12 Conference football team

Footnotes

References
Football Writers Association of America All-America Team
Associated Press All-America Team 
Walter Camp Football Foundation All-America Team
Sporting News All-America Team
Sports Illustrated All-America Team
USA Today All-America Team
ESPN All-America Team
FOX Sports All-America Team
CBS Sports All-America Team
Athlon Sports All-America Team

All-America Team
College Football All-America Teams